Fourteen Songs or 14 Songs may refer to:

Music

Classical compositions
Sergei Rachmaninov, 14 Songs, Op. 34
Georges Taconet: Fourteen Songs

Albums
14 Songs (Paul Westerberg album)
14 Songs, album by Fugazi 1992
14 Songs, album by Maurice Chevalier 1995
Fourteen Songs Of Conscious Insanity redirects to album Reroute to Remain by Flames
Fourteen Songs for Greg Sage and the Wipers redirects to album Eight Songs for Greg Sage and the Wipers